The Münstersche Aa is a river in the Münster region of Westphalia in Germany. It is a left tributary of the Ems. The Münstersche Aa begins near Havixbeck, flows southeast until Münster, and then north to Greven, where it flows into the Ems.

See also
 List of rivers of North Rhine-Westphalia

References

Rivers of North Rhine-Westphalia
Rivers of Germany